Kundalwadi is a city and a municipal council in Nanded district in the Indian state of Maharashtra. Famous for Lord Shiva temple (Kundaleshwar).

Demographics
 India census, Kundalwadi had a population of 14,355. Males constitute 50% of the population and females 50%. Kundalwadi has an average literacy rate of 47%, lower than the national average of 59.5%: male literacy is 58%, and female literacy is 36%. In Kundalwadi, 15% of the population is under 6 years of age. 

Kundalwadi is most famous for medicines for the treatment of dog bite infections.

References

Cities and towns in Nanded district